Kate Ellis is a British author of crime fiction, best known for a series of detective novels, which blends history with mystery, featuring policeman Wesley Peterson.

Ellis' first novel, Merchant's House, published in 1998, received positive reviews and was chosen as one of the ten best summer reads by Woman's Weekly. She has since written 22 more novels in this series, many to critical acclaim.

Ellis has also the written five novels set in Yorkshire as part of the Joe Plantagenet series and an historical crime novel, The Devil's Priest, which is set in 16th century Liverpool. More recently, A High Mortality of Doves and The Boy Who Lived With The Dead commenced a trilogy set in the aftermath of the First World War, featuring DI Albert Lincoln.

She was elected a member of The Detection Club in 2014 and is a member of the Crime Writers Association.

Ellis was the winner of the CWA Dagger in the Library Award 2019

Novels 
Featuring Wesley Peterson
 The Merchant's House, 1998
 The Armada Boy, 1999
 An Unhallowed Grave, 1999
 The Funeral Boat, 2000
 The Bone Garden, 2001
 A Painted Doom, 2002
 The Skeleton Room, 2003
 The Plague Maiden, 2004
 A Cursed Inheritance, 2005
 The Marriage Hearse, 2006
 The Shining Skull, 2007
 The Blood Pit, 2008
 A Perfect Death, 2009
 The Flesh Tailor, 2010
 The Jackal Man, 2011
 The Cadaver Game, 2012
 The Shadow Collector, 2013
 The Shroud Maker, 2014
 The Death Season, 2015
 The House of Eyes, 2016
 The Mermaid's Scream, 2017
The Mechanical Devil, 2018
Dead Man's Lane, 2019
The Burial Circle, 2020
The Stone Chamber, 2021
Serpent’s Point, 2023

Featuring Joe Plantagenet
 Seeking the Dead, 2008
 Playing with Bones, 2009
 Kissing the Demons, 2011
 Watching the Ghosts, 2012
 Walking by the Night, 2015

Others
 The Devil's Priest, 2006 (historical novel)
 A High Mortality of Doves (the first of the Albert Lincoln trilogy), 2016
The Boy Who Lived With The Dead (the second of the Albert Lincoln trilogy), 2018

References

External links

Year of birth missing (living people)
Living people
British crime fiction writers